Khatib (also Romanized as Khaţīb; also known as Khaţīf) is a village in Lalehabad Rural District, Lalehabad District, Babol County, Mazandaran Province, Iran. At the 2006 census, its population was 568, in 144 families.

References 

Populated places in Babol County